Wei Yan is a Chinese-American reproductive biologist, currently Professor of Medicine at David Geffen School of Medicine at UCLA and Senior Investigator at The Lundquist Institute for Biomedical Innovation at Harbor-UCLA Medical Center. He is also University Foundation Professor at University of Nevada, Reno, United States and an Elected Fellow of the American Association for the Advancement of Science.  He is Director of National Center for Male Reproductive Epigenomics and served as the editor-in-chief of the journal Biology of Reproduction.

Bibliography 
Wei Yan was born in Liaoning, China. He received his MD from China Medical University in 1990 and PhD from University of Turku, Finland in 2000.  He completed his post-doc training at Baylor College of Medicine, Houston, TX in 2004. His works focus on genetic and epigenetic control of fertility, as well as epigenetic contribution of gametes (sperm and eggs) to fertilization, early embryonic development and adulthood health. As a principal investigator, Dr. Yan has been awarded a total of 15 grants (~$15 million in direct cost) since 2004. He also so far published >150 peer-reviewed research articles and book chapters in high-impact journals with >11,000 citations and a h-index of 58.

Career and Research 
After receiving his M.D., Dr. Yan became the Chief Examiner at Coroner office of the Institute of Forensic Science of Liaoning Province, Shenyang, China. While he enjoyed his work as an Examiner and developed better techniques for DNA extraction from crime scene samples, but he soon became fascinated with the research aspect and began to pursue a career in research. He enrolled in the Graduate program in the Department of Forensic Medicine at China Medical University while still working at the coroner's office. The next year he took the opportunity to leave China and work as a visiting scholar in the Department of Medical Genetics, at the University of Turku, Finland. He would stay at the University of Turku to finish in Ph.D. in March of 2000 under the supervision of Drs. Jorma Toppari, Ilpo Hutaniemi and Martti Parvinen. After a short stint as a Postdoctoral Associate at University of Turku, he would travel to the United States to work with Dr. Martin M. Matzuk in the Department of Pathology at Baylor College of Medicine in Houston, Texas. It would be here at Baylor College of Medicine that we would get his first professional appointment as an Instructor in the Department of Pathology in 2003. One year later, Dr. Yan would get his first tenure-track Assistant Professorship in the Department of Physiology and Cell Biology at the University of Nevada School of Medicine in Reno Nevada. At UNR, Dr. Yan would go on to be an extremely productive researcher received multiple awards and would climb the ranks to obtain the highest honor bestowed upon Professors; The University of Nevada, Reno Foundation Professor in 2020. During this time he also served as the Editor-in-Chief of Biology or Reproduction, which is the official journal of the Society for the Study of Reproduction (SSR). Having achieved the highest honor at UNR, Dr. Yan would still go on to seek more challenges and moved to Los Angeles to take a Professor of Medicine appointment at the David Geffen School of Medicine at UCLA as well as a Senior Investigator position at The Lundquist Institute for Biomedical Innovation at Harbor-UCLA Medical Center in Torrance, California.

Research on cellular and molecular mechanisms that control sperm production and male fertility 
Dr. Yan and his lab were the first to define many cellular and molecular processes that are required for proper sperm development. For example, Dr. Yan's lab were the first to describe the development of the connecting piece  that links the sperm head to the tail, often called the "neck" of the sperm. This discovery has helped researchers in the field understand headless sperm syndrome seen in infertile men. His lab also discovered and described the process of cytoplasmic removal during spermatogenesis. Furthermore,  Dr. Yan and his group were also the first to describe the importance of motile cilia during sperm transport from the rete testis to the epididymis when they discovered that defective motile cilia that line the efferent ductal can cause sperm aggregation and luminal obstruction, which can eventually lead to male infertility.

Non-hormonal male contraceptives 
Dr. Yan has also been innovative in the contraceptives field with the novel idea of developing non-hormonal male contraceptives that disable sperm rather than killing them. His interested in the field led to the discovery of Triptonide, which is a natural occurring compound purified from the Chinese herb Tripterygium Wilfordii Hook F. Triptonide acts as a reversible non-hormonal contraceptive agent and is the first compound in over 50 years to be tested in mice and monkeys and shown efficacy. This discovery established Triptonide as a drug candidate for "The Pill" for men.

Discovery of novel small RNA species and their function in germ cells 
As a young scientist, Dr. Yan was the first to discover mitochondrial genome-encoded small RNAs (mitosRNAs) and endo-siRNAs in the male germline, as well as meiotic sex chromosome inactivation (MSCI)-escaping X-linked miRNAs and elucidated the functions of all during reproduction.  

As of 2022, Dr. Yan has an h-index of 58 according to Google Scholar and of 51 according to Scopus.

Awards and affiliations 
Some of his awards include:

 2009 Society for the Study of Reproduction (SSR) Young Investigator Award
 2012 American Society of Andrology (ASA) Young Andrologist Award
 2013 Nevada Healthcare Hero Award for Research and Technology
 2017 University of Nevada, Reno Outstanding Researcher Award
 2018 SSR Research Award and the 2020 Nevada System of Higher Education Research Award

He was elected Fellow of the American Association for the Advancement of Science (AAAS) in 2017.

References

External links 

Living people
Chinese biologists
Fellows of the American Association for the Advancement of Science
Year of birth missing (living people)
China Medical University (PRC) alumni
University of Turku alumni
Chinese emigrants to the United States